Thyer Glacier is a tributary glacier, flowing northwest along the south side of the Raggatt Mountains to enter the Rayner Glacier. Mapped from ANARE (Australian National Antarctic Research Expeditions) air photos taken by the RAAF flight in 1956. Named by Antarctic Names Committee of Australia (ANCA) for R.F. Thyer, chief geophysicist, Bureau of Mineral Resources, Australian Department of National Development and Energy.

See also
 List of glaciers in the Antarctic
 Glaciology

References
 

Glaciers of Enderby Land